Bryce Jamison (born January 6, 2006) is an American professional soccer player who plays as a forward for USL Championship side Orange County SC.

Career

Youth
Jamison was born in Atlanta, Georgia, where he played youth soccer with Super Y League side Smyrna Impact United. He later went on to join the Atlanta United academy. Ahead of the club's 2021–22 season, Jamison made the move to the Barça Residency Academy in Arizona. Here he scored five goals in his first eight starts with the U-17 team. Jamison was moved up to the U-19 squad where he helped Barça win the MLS Next Southwest Division. He went on to finish with seven goals in 13 games with Barça's U-19s. In July he was named to the MLS Next All-Star Team.

Professional
On September 23, 2022, Jamison signed a professional multi-year contract with USL Championship side Orange County SC. He made his professional debut on September 24, 2022, appearing as a 90th–minute substitute against Pittsburgh Riverhounds. He scored his first professional goal on October 8, 2022, against El Paso Locomotive in a 2–1 loss.

References

External links
Orange County SC Profile

2006 births
Living people
American soccer players
Association football forwards
Orange County SC players
Soccer players from Georgia (U.S. state)
Sportspeople from Atlanta
USL Championship players